Robert Couri Hay, born April 1949, is an American publicist and gossip columnist. He was a gossip columnist for the National Enquirer from 1976 to 1983. He started his career with Andy Warhol and worked as an interviewer and columnist for Warhol's magazine called Interview Magazine. After that, his columns & stories also appeared in People Magazine, Town & Country and Hamptons Magazine. Later, he contributed stories to The New York Times, New York Post, and Women's Wear Daily. He was featured in CNN’s film Halston. Hay was interviewed in Netflix's docuseries The Andy Warhol Diaries and appeared in several episodes. Notable media events he represented included the centennial anniversary of the Juilliard School, 10th anniversary of the Broadway show Chicago, galas for Lincoln Center, the American Ballet Theatre, the Budapest Symphony Orchestra and the Society of Memorial Sloan Kettering Cancer Center. Some of his notable clients have included Harry Winston, Bergdorf Goodman, Prada, Chopard, Escada, and Bulgari.

Early life & Education 

Hay was born and raised in Portland, Maine. He attended American University in Washington, D.C. He claims to have moved to New York in 1970 at age 20. According to Hay in an interview with Flatt magazine, he was named after his Uncle, A. Robert Couri, a world war two veteran. He studied under Larry McMurtry and had his initial learning from Charles James and Timothy Leary. Hay also did coursework at Georgetown University in 1970.

Career

Publicist
Hay is a publicist based in Manhattan and the Hamptons. He has been the publicist of notable personalities like  Cornelia Guest, Lydia Hearst, Ivanka Trump Amanda HearstPeter Max Lauren Bush, Jean Shafiroff and Suzanne Somers. He has worked with luxury brands such as Harry Winston, Bergdorf Goodman, Prada, Chopard, Escada, and Bulgari, and organized philanthropic events for the Society of Memorial Sloan-Kettering Cancer Center, Lenox Hill Neighborhood House, Henry Street Settlement, the Central Park Conservancy, and the Lighthouse International; his work with New Yorkers for Children resulted in the first benefit event after 9/11. The New York Times, in October 2014, noted career milestones of Hay as a publicist and quoted the writer Jay McInerney who called Hay "irrepressible."

Gossip columnist 
Hay was a gossip columnist for the National Enquirer from 1976 to 1983. He was an editor for Andy Warhol's Interview magazine. Hay starred in Anton Perich's public access television show and interviewed artists like Louise Nevelson and John Cage. Hay appeared on the cover of New York Magazine in August 1979 talking about "The Weird World of Cable TV," and was also on the cover of Cable TV World. The Los Angeles Times labeled Hay one of the interviewers who had the "skill and subtlety to draw... flashes of devilish wit and astute observation, as well as delicious gossip." He was quoted about gossip in Newsweek Magazine. In January 1979, Hay and Zandra Rhodes shared fact-findings on their trip to China with the New Yorker, and in 1970, Hay reported on his trip to Cuba. Hay also began to write for Town & Country and People. The same year, Hay started his own company: R. Couri Hay Creative Public Relations.

Until it was sold late in 2018, Hay wrote a monthly society column for Avenue Magazine (New York) covering the "Hamptons chicest galas and posh private parties to "Happening in Manhattan and the South Fork." He was the society editor for Hamptons Magazine and a columnist for Gotham Magazine. In the summer of 2013 and 2014 he wrote weekly Hampton's Magazine profiles on cultural icons. He also writes "Corner Office" profiles in Gotham Magazine. Hay has been mentioned in gossip columns such as the New York Post, New York Daily News, and the New York Observer.

He has appeared as a gossip columnist on The Today Show, Fox, MSNBC, Extra, PBS, ABC's Primetime Live, CNN Headline News, Showbiz Tonight, E! News Live, E! True Hollywood Story, ABC World News Now and VH1's The Fabulous Life.

Other ventures
Hay took on the role of drawing a younger crowd to the American Ballet Theatre and organized a "Junior Council" that acted as co-chairs for the ballet theater's annual gala with Anne Hearst, Cornelia Guest and Count Erik Wachtmeister. By the 1980s, Hay began planning parties at Studio 54 and hosted celebrity parties at his New York City townhouse; one party was Boy George's 24th birthday party. Hay became a partner in the now closed supper club Tatou in New York.

In May 2014, Hay "lent a series of rare Charles James drawings" to the Metropolitan Museum of Arts Exhibition, "Beyond Fashion" and was referenced in the Charles James' book by Harold Koda titled "Beyond Fashion" for a 24-hour "video project" both Hay and filmmaker Anton Perich created. Interview Magazine revisited Hay's interview with Charles James. In the fall of 2014, New York Magazine announced that Hay's collection of Charles James' sketches would be displayed at The National Arts Club. The New York Times art critic Roberta Smith reviewed the exhibition, "Charles James Beneath the Dress," at The National Arts Club saying: "Nothing reflects the complex, sometimes fraught sensibility of the great fashion designer Charles James as completely as his drawings...this exhibition presents 93 drawings from the 1960s and '70s. All come from the collection of R. Couri Hay, a writer who works in public relations and was a confidant of James's late in his life." In 2015, Hay appeared weekly on The Charles James Story, a documentary series on the designer by Anton Perich that airs on cable television every Monday night. Hay's novel Secret Lives was excerpted in Michael Musto’s Village Voice column. R. Couri Hay serves as the President of the Jury governing the 14th Anniversary of the New York International Film Festival. Hay was also friends with designer Charles James and purchased his drawings to support him. Hay also had recorded 40 hours of James’ recollections. The recollections and around 200 drawings of Charles James that were owned by Hay were donated to Met's Costume Institute.

Personal life and Family

At age 17, Hay had a affair with the designer Halston. Hay currently lives in NYC  with his king charles cavaliers spaniels Cornelia and Webster.  Hay has also claimed to have a political background and has mentioned in an interview that his great grand father, Harry F. G. Hay (who also owned the town’s bank known as Westbrook Trust Company) and held the post of mayor of Westbrook in Maine. He also said that one of his ancestors, John Hay was an assistant to Abraham Lincoln and also took the position of Secretary of State. His grandmother Alice White was a concert pianist and attended the New England Conservatory of Music and Juilliard School. Alice White played with the Boston Symphony and during World War II, she went to Europe to play for the troops. His mother's family, he said, founded Camp Couri in Maine for inner city kids where they could get acquainted with country life. Additionally, they also founded several senior centers in Maine. General Society of Mayflower descendants reported that Hay is a descendant of Stephen Hopkins. Hay's family also owns a rug company called Couristan.

References 

Living people
American publicists
American columnists
American University alumni
LGBT people from Maine
Writers from Portland, Maine
1949 births
Journalists from New York City